Dendrobium teretifolium, commonly known as the thin pencil orchid, rat's tail orchid or bridal veil orchid, is an epiphytic or lithophytic orchid in the family Orchidaceae. It has long, thin hanging stems, pencil-like leaves and rigid flowering stems bearing up to twelve crowded white to cream-coloured flowers. It grows in rainforest and humid open forest mostly in near-coastal districts in New South Wales and Queensland.

Description
The side lobes curve upwards and the middle lobe has a long, thin tip, crinkled edges and three wavy ridges on its top. Flowering occurs from July to August.

Taxonomy and naming
Dendrobium teretifolium was first formally described in 1810 by Robert Brown and the description was published in his Prodromus Florae Novae Hollandiae et Insulae Van Diemen. The specific epithet (teretifolium) is from derived from the Latin words teres meaning "rounded" and folium meaning "a leaf".

Distribution and habitat
The thin pencil orchid grows on rocks but usually on trees, with a preference for hoop pine Araucaria cunninghamii in Queensland and for Casuarina glauca in New South Wales. It occurs on the coast and nearby ranges from near Calliope to Bega and is found in rainforest, along streams and near mangroves.

References 

teretifolium
Endemic orchids of Australia
Orchids of Queensland
Orchids of New South Wales
Plants described in 1810
Taxa named by Robert Brown (botanist, born 1773)
Epiphytic orchids
Lithophytic orchids